The Yemeni Ministry of Interior (MOI) (وزارة الداخلية اليمنية) is a government body that is responsible for internal security and Law enforcement in Yemen. It was established in 1990 after the reunification. On 21 February 2013, President Abd Rabbuh Mansour Hadi issued a presidential decree to reform structure of the Ministry of Interior. The Decree specified that: 

The Ministry of Interior consists of many departments and services, mainly:

 Public Security, 
 Special Security Forces (SSF), formerly Central Security Organization
 Police Facilities and Personalities Protection
 Police Patrols and Safety Roads (formerly Njdah)
 Yemeni Civil Defence
 Coast Guard, established in 2003
 General Directorate of Transit Police

List of interior ministers

References 

Interior ministers of Yemen
Law enforcement in Yemen
Government ministries of Yemen
Ministry of Interior (Yemen)